WXIT (1200 AM) is a radio station that broadcasts in a top 40/CHR format. Licensed to Blowing Rock, in the U.S. state of North Carolina, the station is currently owned by High Country Ventures, LLC.

WXIT has been granted an FCC construction permit to move to a new transmitter site, decrease day power to 4,200 watts and discontinue critical hours service.

History
After buying WJTP in 1996 and changing its letters to WECR, Steve Rondinaro's Rondinaro Broadcasting started WECR-FM (now WWMY) and added WXIT.

Aisling purchased these stations, as well as WATA and WZJS, which were owned by Highland Communication Associates. Aisling went into receivership in early 2008. George Reed of Media Services Group was appointed to manage the stations until a buyer was found.

On August 20, 2016, WXIT changed their format from news/talk to top 40/CHR, branded as "Pulse Boone", and is one of only a few stations across the country carrying current hits on an AM signal.

References

External links

XIT
Watauga County, North Carolina
XIT
Radio stations established in 1983
1983 establishments in North Carolina
Contemporary hit radio stations in the United States